Saint Louis University School of Law, also known as SLU LAW, is a private American law school located in St. Louis, Missouri. It is one of the professional graduate schools of Saint Louis University. The University hosted a law school briefly from 1843 to 1847, making it the first law school to open west of the Mississippi River and first Catholic law school in the United States. The current law school was established in 1908 with its current name. The school has been ABA approved since 1924 and is a member of the Association of American Law Schools. Housed in Scott Hall, the law school has the highest enrollment of law students in Missouri. SLU Law has the highest bar passage rate in the state of Missouri. It offers both full- and part-time programs. The school is home to the University's Vincent C. Immel Law Library, one of the largest law libraries in the state of Missouri. Supreme Court Justice Clarence Thomas studied for his bar exam at the old Omer Poos Law Library on the main SLU campus.

It was the first ABA law school in St. Louis to accept African-American students. In 1908, the law school accepted its first female law students. In the fall of 2013, the school moved to its current location, Scott Hall, a new facility in Downtown St. Louis.

Degree programs
Most students are enrolled in the full-time J.D. program. SLU LAW has the only part-time J.D. program in St. Louis. The school also offers dual-degree programs and an LL.M in Health Law and an LL.M Program in American Law for Foreign Lawyers.

Full-time program
During their first year, full-time students are required to take 15 hours per semester to complete the core courses . After the first year, full-time upper-division students select from more than 150 hours of upper-division course electives to complete the required 91 credit hours. Of the remaining 61 credit hours, only the following are required courses: 1) Legal Profession; 2) a seminar of the student's choice; 3) a humanities course and 4) a professional skills courses.

The evening program
There is an evening program with classes three to four nights a week; students in this program can earn their Juris Doctor degree in four to five years.

Academics

Centers

Center for Health Law Studies
Since its establishment before 1990, the Center for Health Law Studies is consistently listed first in health law by U.S. News & World Report. . The center has eleven full-time faculty members who publish work in law, medicine and ethical journals. It offers a broad range of health law courses taught by full-time faculty, including foundational and specialized health law courses each semester.

Center for International and Comparative Law
The Center for International and Comparative Law promotes international legal scholarship in the law school.  Faculty members teach pragmatic and theory based courses, such as public international law, international trade, multinational corporate responsibility, international tax, comparative law, immigration law, comparative criminal law, gender rights and international human rights.  Speakers and practitioners are also invited to the school to discuss and teach. Students are eligible to earn a certificate from the center, as well as study abroad in Madrid, Berlin, Orléans, Paris, Bochum, and Cork.  The center also has a Jessup Moot Court Team, which advanced on to the semi-final rounds of the Southwest Super Regionals in 2009 in Houston, Texas, and subsequently won third place for best brief overall.

Center for Employment Law
The center's extensive curriculum offers a range of courses addressing the rights and responsibilities of employers and employees, including the prohibition of discrimination; establishment of collective bargaining relationships in the private and public sector; regulation of employee benefits, health and safety in the workplace; and arbitration and mediation of labor and employment disputes. To obtain a certificate in employment law, students complete 11 hours of approved coursework in the employment field and write a paper of publishable quality on an employment law topic in addition to receiving a J.D. degree. All students in the Certificate program take the basic law labor course. The Center enhances the students' exposure to critical issues in labor and employment law by presenting conferences that explore current significant topics in the field. Every year, the student-sponsored Employment Law Association and the Center offer a variety of extra-curricular programs for students .

Clinics
SLU LAW professors and students annually provide more than 39,000 hours of free legal service, totaling an estimated $3.9 million, to the community through the School of Law's Legal Clinics and public service programs. The Legal Clinics offer SLU LAW upper division students practical experience while providing legal services to the community. Students are able to appear in court on cases under Missouri's Student Practice Rule. A full-time faculty member supervises the in-house students.

In-House Clinics
 Appellate Advocacy
 Criminal Defense
 Elder Law
 Entrepreneurship and Community Development
 Intellectual Property
 Special Education
 Children's Advocacy
 Juvenile Law
 Homeless Veterans
 Consumer Rights
 Landlord-Tenant Law
 Small Business Development
 Civil Rights
 Family Law
 Immigration
 Mediation

Externships
 Health Law Externships including Semester in Washington, D.C.
 Prosecutor Externships
 Public Defender Externships
 Public Interest/Government Externships
 Transactional/Tax Externships
 Judicial Externships

Concentrations
The school offers "concentrations" in business transaction law, civil litigation skills, criminal litigation skills, employment law, health law, intellectual property law, international & comparative law, taxation, and urban development, land use and environment law.  Each of these concentrations has different requirements, allowing students to specialize their legal education.

Examinations
First-year students take four final examinations each semester, one for each class other than legal research and writing. All other students self-schedule their exams. Generally the exam period is two weeks long; graduating students are required to complete exams in a shorter time. Students may choose between typing their exams on laptop computers or handwriting them. As at most other law schools, exams are graded on a curve determined by the section.

Admissions
The median LSAT score for the 2019 incoming class was 155. The median GPA was 3.45.

Facilities

SLU LAW is located in Scott Hall, a 12-story facility located at 100 N. Tucker Blvd. in downtown St. Louis. The building contains classrooms, the law library, the school's administrative and faculty offices, event space, and a restaurant called "The Docket." The legal clinics are housed on the 7th floor of the building. The 12th floor, which was added to the building during renovations, is almost entirely glass, offering views of the surrounding downtown area from the courtroom and indoor/outdoor event areas. The school's downtown location puts it in close proximity to many law firms and city, state and federal courts.

Prior to Scott Hall, the law school was housed in three buildings on the main SLU campus in Midtown.  Morrissey Hall housed the bulk of the law school, including the law library, four large lecture halls, faculty offices, and some administrative space. Queen's Daughters Hall is a historic building and housed the rest of the administrative offices and meeting rooms.  The law school also had a separate clinic building located on Spring Street, one block from the main building. The clinic was renovated and enlarged in 2008.

Rankings
In the 2016 U.S. News & World Report rankings, Saint Louis University School of Law was ranked 82 in "Best Law Schools" list. SLU's Center for Health Law Studies was ranked the No. 1 program in the country.  In the new 2012 category "When Lawyers Do the Grading," the School of Law was ranked 67 by recruiters and hiring partners at highly rated firms.

Student publications
The school has three student-edited academic law journals:
Saint Louis University Law Journal - The Journal is SLU LAW's oldest and largest law journal. It publishes four times a year. The Journal hosts a spring symposium and the fall Childress Lecture, named for a former dean of the law school.
Saint Louis University Journal of Labor & Employment - The Labor and Employment Journal is a specialty journal focusing on labor and employment issues. 
Saint Louis University Journal of Health Law & Policy - The Journal of Health Law and Policy is another specialty journal that is paired with the law school's health law center. It publishes twice a year and hosts a spring health law symposium together with the center.

The Saint Louis Brief is a publication about the law school that is distributed to alumni and supporters.

Students at one time published the 1843 Reporter, an independent student newspaper administered and funded without assistance from the school. It published bi-monthly and sought to foster a sense of community and on-campus dialogue, as well as provide an outlet for students wishing to publish in a non-journal forum. The school also previously published the Saint Louis University Public Law Review.

Student organizations
Saint Louis University School of Law has nearly 30 student organizations. The organizations' funding is distributed in part by the law school's student government, the Student Bar Association (SBA). Organizations include:

American Constitution Society
American Trial Lawyers Association
Animal Law
A Real Community Here (ARCH)
Asian American Law Students Association (AALSA)
Black Law Students' Association (BLSA)
Business Law Association (BLA)
Christian Legal Society
Criminal Law Society
Employment Law Association
Environmental Law Society (ELS)
Federalist Society
First Chair Society
Health Law Association
Hispanic Law Student Association
International Law Students' Association (ILSA)
J. Reuben Clark Law Society
Jewish Legal Society
Mark Twain Law Student Association
Older Wiser Law Students
OUTLAWS
Phi Alpha Delta (PAD)
Phi Delta Phi (PDP)
Public Interest Law Group (PILG)
Sports and Entertainment Law Association
St. Thomas More Society
Student Intellectual Property Law Association (SIPLA)
Student Legal Writers' Association
Veteran's Law Student Association
Women Law Students' Association

Employment 
The Saint Louis University School of Law Class of 2017 reported a 92.14% employment rate for graduates employed in both full-time bar passage required (77.77% of graduates) and full-time JD advantage (14.37% of graduates) positions as of March 15, 2018.

Costs
The total cost of attendance (indicating the cost of tuition, fees, and living expenses) at SLU LAW for the 2014–2015 academic year is $59,608. The Law School Transparency estimated debt-financed cost of attendance for three years is $220,008.

Notable faculty

Current
Hon. George Draper, current, trial advocacy, former Chief Justice of the Missouri Supreme Court
Isaak Dore, current, international law
Roger Goldman, current, constitutional law, criminal procedure
Joel K. Goldstein, current, constitutional law, specialist in the Vice Presidency of the United States
Stephen Hanlon, current, public interest litigation, founder the Community Services Team (CST) at Holland & Knight 
Justin Hansford, current, human rights, human rights activist.
William P. Johnson, current dean, international law, commercial transactions
Kevin O'Malley, current, Professor of Practice, Ambassador in Residence, former United States Ambassador to Ireland 
Ann M. Scarlett, current, former clerk of U.S. Supreme Court Justice Clarence Thomas
Stephen C. Thaman, current, comparative criminal law
Anders E. Walker, current, constitutional and criminal law
Hon. Michael A. Wolff, emeritus, former Chief Justice of the Missouri Supreme Court

Past
Charles B. Blackmar (1966–1982)
Paul Blakwell, former Dean
Richard J. Childress, former Dean 1969–1976
Thomas Eagleton
Alphonse G. Eberle, former Dean
Stanislaw Frankowski
 Rev Robert J. Henle, S.J., McDonnell Professor of Justice in American Society; served as president of Georgetown University from 1969 to 1976
Hauwa Ibrahim (Fall 2006)
Vincent C. Immel (1958–2004), former Dean
Donald B. King
J. Norman McDonough, former Dean 1953–1961
Hon. Theodore McMillian (1952–1972)
John F.T. Murray, former Dean
Eileen H. Searls
Joseph J. Simeone (1947–1972)

Notable alumni
 John Richard Barret, former U.S. Congressman. 
 John R. Bender, Kansas State University, Saint Louis University, and University of Houston head football coach 
 Dana Boente,  United States Attorney for the Eastern District of Virginia from 2013 to 2018; Acting Attorney General of the United States, from January to February 2017
 Freeman Bosley Jr., former Mayor of the City of St. Louis, from 1993 until 1997  
 Jack Buechner, lawyer and politician; served in the United States House of Representatives representing Missouri's 2nd congressional district, from 1987 to 1991
 Quico Canseco, attorney, businessman, and former U.S. Representative for Texas's 23rd congressional district
 Patrick J. Conroy, 60th Chaplain of the United States House of Representatives, served from May 25, 2011 until January 3, 2021
 Ben Dogra, sports agent
 Richard Dooling, novelist and screenwriter
 Mariano Favazza, former Circuit Court Clerk of the Missouri Circuit Court, Twenty Second Judicial Circuit, City of St. Louis
 Lowe Finney, Tennessee politician 
 Michael R. Gibbons, Current President Pro Tem of the Missouri Senate.
 James W. Gray, Illinois state legislator and judge
 William R. Haine, Illinois state senator, representing the 56th district from his appointment in November 2002 until 2019
 Robert E. Hannegan (LL.B. 1925)
 Connie L. Johnson, Missouri State Representative
 David Merrick, theatrical producer
 Kevin O'Malley, United States Ambassador to Ireland (2014–present)
 Richard J. Rabbitt, Democratic politician from St. Louis; Speaker of the Missouri House of Representatives, from 1973 to 1976 
 Eric Schmitt,  43rd Attorney General of Missouri, since 2019
 Francis G. Slay, former Mayor of the City of St. Louis (2001– 2017)
 Steven Stafstrom, Connecticut State Representative, Chair House Judiciary Committee 
 Steve Stenger, attorney; served as County Executive of St. Louis County, Missouri from January 2015 to April 2019
 Joseph P. Teasdale, former Governor of Missouri
 Buzz Westfall, lawyer and politician; served in the elected offices of Prosecuting Attorney (1978–1990) and County Executive (1991–2003) of St. Louis County, Missouri   
 Wyvetter H. Younge, Democratic member of the Illinois House of Representatives, representing the 114th District from 1975 until 2008
 Ben Ysursa, Secretary of State of Idaho, from 2003 to 2015

Missouri Court of Appeals, Eastern District
Theodore McMillian, 1949
John P. Torbitzky, 2012

United States District Court, Eastern District of Missouri
Henry Autrey, 1977
Stephen R. Clark Sr., 1991
Edward Louis Filippine, 1957
Donald J. Stohr, 1958

United States District Court, Eastern District of Michigan 
 Stephen J. Murphy III, 1987

United States District Court, Southern District of Illinois
Stephen P. McGlynn
Omer Poos
Michael Joseph Reagan
William D. Stiehl

United States District Court, Central District of Illinois
Michael P. McCuskey
Michael M. Mihm
Sara Darrow

United States Court of Appeals, Eighth Circuit
 Theodore McMillian, 1949

References

External links

 
Saint Louis University
Law schools in Missouri
Educational institutions established in 1843
Jesuit universities and colleges in the United States
1843 establishments in Missouri
Catholic law schools in the United States